Louis Wilson may refer to:

Louis B. Wilson (1866–1943), chief of pathology at Mayo Clinic
Louis Dicken Wilson (1789–1847), politician and general from North Carolina
Louis H. Wilson Jr. (1920–2005), 26th Commandant of the Marine Corps and a recipient of the Medal of Honor
Louis Round Wilson (1876–1979), American librarian
Louis L. Wilson Jr. (1919–2010), U.S. Air Force general

See also
Lou Wilson, Australian rules footballer
Lewis Wilson (disambiguation)